Traverella is a genus of pronggilled mayflies in the family Leptophlebiidae.

Species
These 13 species belong to the genus Traverella:

 Traverella albertana (McDunnough, 1931) i c g b
 Traverella bradleyi (Needham & Murphy, 1924) c
 Traverella calingastensis Domínguez, 1995 c g
 Traverella holzenthali Lugo-Ortiz and McCafferty, 1996 i c g
 Traverella insolita g
 Traverella lewisi Allen, 1973 i c g
 Traverella longifrons Lugo-Ortiz and McCafferty, 1996 i c g
 Traverella montium (Ulmer, 1943) c g
 Traverella presidiana (Traver, 1934) i c g
 Traverella promifrons Lugo-Ortiz and McCafferty, 1996 i c g
 Traverella sallei (Navás, 1935) i c g
 Traverella valdemari (Esben-Petersen, 1912) c g
 Traverella versicolor (Eaton, 1892) i c

Data sources: i = ITIS, c = Catalogue of Life, g = GBIF, b = Bugguide.net

References

Mayfly genera
Insects of Europe
Mayflies